Corps colours, or Troop-function colours (German: Waffenfarben) were worn in the Waffen-SS from 1938 until 1945 in order to distinguish between various branches of service, units, and functions. The corps colours were part of the pipings, gorget patches (collar patches), and shoulder boards. The colour scheme was similar to the corps colours of the German Army from 1935 to 1945. The colours appeared mainly on the piping around the shoulder boards showing a soldier's rank.

Colours and examples
The table below contains the Waffen-SS corps colours, and examples for their use from 1938 to 1945.

See also
Corps colours of the Sturmabteilung
Corps colours of the Luftwaffe (1935–1945)

References
Adolf Schlicht, John R. Angolia: Die deutsche Wehrmacht, Uniformierung und Ausrüstung 1933-1945Vol. 1: Das Heer, Motorbuch Verlag, Stuttgart 1992Vol. 3: Die Luftwaffe, Motorbuch Verlag, Stuttgart 1999(very detailed information and discussion but no coloured images)

External links
Waffenfarben of the Wehrmacht Heer
German WWII Army & SS Rank & Insignia

SS ranks
Nazi paramilitary ranks
SS
German military uniforms
Waffen-SS